State elections were held in South Australia on 4 March 1950. All 39 seats in the South Australian House of Assembly were up for election. The incumbent Liberal and Country League led by Premier of South Australia Thomas Playford IV defeated the Australian Labor Party led by Leader of the Opposition Mick O'Halloran.

Background
Only one seat changed hands, rural Stanley saw the Labor member re-elected as an independent member. Notably, neither major party contested the independent-held seat of Ridley.

Results

|}

 The primary vote figures were from contested seats, while the statewide two-party-preferred vote figures were estimated from all seats.

Post-election pendulum

See also
Results of the South Australian state election, 1950 (House of Assembly)
Candidates of the 1950 South Australian state election
Members of the South Australian House of Assembly, 1950-1953
Members of the South Australian Legislative Council, 1950-1953
Playmander

Notes

External links
Two-party preferred figures since 1950, ABC News Online

Elections in South Australia
1950 elections in Australia
1950s in South Australia
March 1950 events in Australia